Manasterz  is a village in the administrative district of Gmina Jawornik Polski, within Przeworsk County, Subcarpathian Voivodeship, in south-eastern Poland.

References

Manasterz